Yolaltı is a village in the Kâhta District, Adıyaman Province, Turkey. The village is populated by Kurds of the Reşwan tribe and had a population of 564 in 2021.

The hamlet of Erler is attached to the village.

References

Villages in Kâhta District

Kurdish settlements in Adıyaman Province